John Boyd is an American sound engineer. He was nominated for two Academy Awards in the category Best Sound.

Selected filmography
 Empire of the Sun (1987)
 Who Framed Roger Rabbit (1988)

References

External links

Year of birth missing (living people)
Living people
American audio engineers